Marteinsson is an Icelandic patronymic surname, literally meaning "son of Martein". Notable people with the name include:

Andri Marteinsson (born 1965), Icelandic footballer
Július Marteinsson (born 1960), Icelandic footballer
Pétur Marteinsson (born 1973), Icelandic footballer

Icelandic-language surnames